Nyctemera clathratum is a moth of the family Erebidae first described by Vollenhoven in 1863. It is found in New Guinea and on the Moluccas (Ambon, Saparua and Seram).

References

Nyctemerina
Moths described in 1863